"Heal the World" is a song recorded by American recording artist Michael Jackson from his eighth studio album, Dangerous (1991). It was released on November 23, 1992 as the sixth single from the album. It was written and composed by Jackson, and produced by Jackson and Bruce Swedien. It is a song steeped with antiwar lyrics and Jackson's wish for humanity of making the world a better place.

In a 2001 Internet chat with fans, Jackson said that "Heal the World" is the song he was most proud to have created. He also created the Heal the World Foundation, a charitable organization which was designed to improve the lives of children. The organization was also meant to teach children how to help others. This concept of 'betterment for all' would become a centerpiece for the Dangerous World Tour. In the documentary Living with Michael Jackson, Jackson said he created the song in his "Giving Tree" at Neverland Ranch.

An ensemble performance of "We Are the World" and "Heal the World" closed Jackson's memorial service at the Staples Center in Los Angeles on July 7, 2009. The song was performed as rehearsed by Jackson at the venue just weeks earlier, in preparation for his planned "This Is It" concerts in London along with "Dirty Diana". R&B singer Ciara sang the song as a tribute to Jackson at the 2009 BET Awards.

The song was played at the funeral of James Bulger, and Jackson also donated the song to be used as the anthem for the James Bulger Red Balloon Centre, a school for children to go to if they are being bullied or have learning difficulties.

Composition
This song is written in the key of A major (but later transitions to B Major as a choir starts singing, and last more chorus in D major from the end), and it spans from E3 to C#5. It has a tempo of 80 beats per minute.

Reception

Critical reception
Chris Lacy from Albumism described the song as "a beautifully understated anthem whose lyrics call for universal improvement." AllMusic editor Stephen Thomas Erlewine called it "middle-class soft." Larry Flick from Billboard viewed "Heal the World" as a "oh-so-sweet call for peace and love". He added, "Although tune sounds a bit like "We Are the World", the sincerity in his vocal cuts through a somewhat overblown arrangement and choir climax." Randy Clark from Cash Box said that it's "musically about as close a jab at his previous "We Are The World" as he could pull off without Quincy Jones and the superstar backing." He added that "the sing-along ballad features mostly Michael's vocals, bringing in a choir at the end for the full effect. The universal message is also the theme of his current world tour." After Jackson's death, the Daily Vault's Michael R. Smith wrote, "Certainly, message songs like "Heal the World" and "Gone Too Soon" have a striking and sad resonance now that Jackson is no longer with us, so in that way his legacy is preserved and his music does live on." David Browne of Entertainment Weekly praised the song, "And when his voice isn't competing with drum machines, it has rarely sounded stronger-achingly pure". Rolling Stones Alan Light was not satisfied, calling it "a Hallmark-card knockoff of 'We Are the World'."

Commercial reception
The song reached number two in the UK Singles Chart in December 1992, kept off the number one position by Whitney Houston's "I Will Always Love You". It peaked number 27 on the Billboard Hot 100.

Music video
The accompanying music video for the song was directed by Joe Pytka and features children living in countries suffering from unrest, especially Burundi. The version of the video included on Dangerous: The Short Films and Michael Jackson's Vision contains an introductory video that features a speech from Jackson taken from the special "spoken word" version of the track. This version was not included on Video Greatest Hits – HIStory featuring the music video. Jackson performed the song in the Super Bowl XXVII halftime show with a 35,000 person flash card performance.

Track listing

7" single and cassette single:
 "Heal the World" (7" Edit) – 4:32
 "She Drives Me Wild" – 3:41

12" single:
 "Heal the World" (Album Version) – 6:25
 "Wanna Be Startin' Somethin'" (Brothers in Rhythm House Mix) – 7:40
 "Don't Stop 'til You Get Enough" (Rogers Underground Solution) – 6:18
 "Rock with You" (Masters at Work Remix) – 5:29

CD maxi:
 "Heal the World" (7" Edit) – 4:32
 "Heal the World" (7" Edit with Intro) – 4:55
 "Heal the World" (LP Version) – 6:25
 "She Drives Me Wild" (Album Version) – 3:41

CD promo:
 "Heal the World" (7" Edit) – 4:32
 "Heal the World" (7" Edit with Intro) – 4:55

DualDisc single:
DVD side
 "Heal the World" (Music Video) – 7:31
 "Heal the World" (Single Version) – 4:32
 "Will You Be There" – 7:39

Charts

Weekly charts

Year-end charts

Certifications and sales

Personnel

Written and composed by Michael Jackson
Produced by Michael Jackson
Co-produced by Bruce Swedien
Recorded and mixed by Bruce Swedien and Matt Forger
Lead and Background Vocals by Michael Jackson 
Rhythm arrangement by Michael Jackson
Vocal arrangement by Michael Jackson and John Bahler
Choir arrangement by John Bahler, featuring the John Bahler Singers
Prelude composed, arranged and conducted by Marty Paich
Keyboards: David Paich and Brad Buxer
Synthesizers: Michael Boddicker, David Paich and Steve Porcaro
Drums: Jeff Porcaro, John Robinson (tom overdubs)
Percussion: Bryan Loren
Orchestra arranged and conducted by Marty Paich
Ending solo vocal: Christa Collins
Playground girl: Ashley Farell

Cover versions
Leif Bloms recorded the song on 1993 album Dej ska jag älska all min tid.

Aled Jones recorded the song on his 2002 album From The Heart.

Connie Talbot, a finalist from Season 1 of Britain's Got Talent, released a variation of the song in November 2011 on her album, Beautiful World.
In 2016 Mumbai-based folk music duo Maati Baani (formed by Nirali Kartik and Kartik Shah) released a cover of the song featuring 45 child artists between the ages of 5 and 13 from India, South Africa, Russia, Canada, Japan and the United States, displaying an eclectic array of musical styles.
Jillian Ward covered the song in 2021 for the Frontliners during the COVID-19 pandemic in the Philippines.

See also
 List of anti-war songs

References

External links
Official music video (US)
Heal The World Live at Super Bowl XXVII (US)

Anti-war songs
1990s ballads
1991 songs
1992 singles
Epic Records singles
Leif Bloms songs
Michael Jackson songs
Songs written by Michael Jackson
Song recordings produced by Michael Jackson
Number-one singles in Spain